For Now may refer to:

 For Now (album), a 2018 album by DMA's
 For Now (EP), an EP by Jordin Sparks
 For Now (song), a song by Pink